Peter Veszelits (born 23 January 1968) is a Slovak water polo player. He competed at the 1992 Summer Olympics and the 2000 Summer Olympics.

References

1968 births
Living people
Slovak male water polo players
Olympic water polo players of Czechoslovakia
Olympic water polo players of Slovakia
Water polo players at the 1992 Summer Olympics
Water polo players at the 2000 Summer Olympics
Sportspeople from Košice